Saudagar is a 1973 Bollywood drama film, directed by Sudhendu Roy and based on the Bengali story, Ras, by Narendranath Mitra. It stars Nutan as Mahzubeen and Amitabh Bachchan as Moti, in the leading roles. It also featured Trilok Kapoor and Padma Khanna as Phoolbanu. Murad, Leela Mishra as (Badi Bhi), Dev Kishan, Jugnu and V. Gopal are also featured in the film. Though the film didn't do well commercially, it was selected as the Indian entry for the Best Foreign Language Film at the 46th Academy Awards, but didn't receive a nomination.

Plot
Moti (Amitabh Bachchan) is a "gur" (unrefined concentrated cane sugar) trader who trades in the seasonal gur made of "Khajur" (date-nectar). During the offseason, he meets a girl, Phoolbanu, and falls in love with her. Moti approaches Phoolbanu's father, who asks for mehar (bride price), which he does not have.

Majubee (Nutan), a widow who is Moti's business associate, prepares the gur for him to sell. Her gur (and consequently Moti's) is very famous and people always prefer to buy from Moti. Moti decides to marry Majubee so that he does not have to pay her, and hence can save more and sooner. Majubee, unaware of Moti's ulterior motive, is first surprised by the proposal, but later accepts it. At the end of the season, Moti saves enough for the meher and divorces Majubee.

This incident shocks Majubee and people of the community. Moti meets Phoolbanu's father and asks again for his daughter's hand. Satisfied with the meher, he marries off his daughter (Phoolbanu) to Moti. All is fine till the Gur season arrives. Phoolbanu is terrible at making Gur, and Moti's customers stop buying from his shop. Meanwhile, a fish trader (Majhi) asks Majubee to marry him. He is honest with her to say that he has small children and wants Majubee to look after them. He always treats her with courtesy.

It is almost the end of the gur season, and Moti does not make a good profit that year. One day Phoolbanu making the gur left in between to take bath when Moti arrives and sees the gur has been burnt. He badly beats Phoolbanu with a stick. Now he is finally left with no other option than to request Majubee to make a few vats of Gur for him to sell. He takes two cans of date-nectar and approaches Majubee at her husband's house to request her to make him some Gur to sell. He is followed by Phoolbanu. At first, Majubee is very angry on seeing Moti but understands that he is in a pitiful condition and is indirectly begging her forgiveness. She also sees Phoolbanu listening to everything from behind a fence. As the eyes of the two ladies meet, they start weeping and hug each other affectionately. The movie ends with this scene.

Cast
Nutan as Majubee "Maju", Moti's former wife. 
Amitabh Bachchan as Motallib a. k.a Moti
Trilok Kapoor as Nadeer
Padma Khanna as Phoolbanu "Phool jaan" 
Murad as Sheikh		
Leela Mishra as Badi Bhi
Dev Kishan as Waheed Bhaijan, Razak's elder brother
Jugnu as Usman
V. Gopal as Gafoor 
C.S. Dubey as Banerjee
 Yunus Bihari as buyer
 H.L. Pardesi as Sikandar
 Paro as Khaala
 Habiba Rehman as village girl
 Narbada Shankar as Mallik babu
 Shriram Shastri as Sadan babu
 Suraiya as villager

Music
The music for the film was composed by the versatile composer Late Ravindra Jain. Lyrics were also by Ravindra Jain. He composed several memorable songs for the movie, notably:
"Sajana Hain Mujhe Sajna Ke Liye" - Asha Bhosle
"Kyon Laayo Sainya Paan" - Asha Bhosle
"Husn Hain Ya Koi Qayamat Hain" - Mohammed Rafi, Aarti Mukherji
"Har Haseen Cheez Ka" - Kishore Kumar
"Door Hain Kinara" - Manna Dey
"Tera Mera Saath Rahe" - Lata Mangeshkar
"Main hoon Phool Banu" - Lata Mangeshkar

See also
 List of submissions to the 46th Academy Awards for Best Foreign Language Film
 List of Indian submissions for the Academy Award for Best Foreign Language Film

References

External links

1973 films
1973 drama films
Indian drama films
1970s Hindi-language films
Films scored by Ravindra Jain
Films based on short fiction
Rajshri Productions films
Films directed by Sudhendu Roy
Hindi-language drama films
Films based on works by Narendranath Mitra